The Murphy Institute is a research and educational center that supports a number of academic programs in the fields of political economy and ethics at Tulane University, New Orleans, Louisiana, United States.

History
The Murphy Institute was founded in 1980 with a generous contribution from the Murphy family. It was established to be a research and educational center aimed at understanding and linking the economic, ethical, and political questions and practices within our society.  The Institute has three core programs: an interdisciplinary undergraduate program in political economy, established in 1984; the Center for Ethics and Public Affairs, started in 2001 to address critical ethical questions and dilemmas related to citizenship, justice, community, and professional responsibility; and the Public Policy program, created in 2010 seeking to foster research and outreach on public policy. As a means to enrich teaching and research in political economy, ethics, and public policy, the Murphy Institute also regularly hosts conferences, seminars, and lectures by prominent public figures and visiting scholars and co-sponsors publications.
  Steven M. Sheffrin is the Director of the Murphy Institute.

Murphy Family
The Murphy Institute was established in memory of Charles H. Murphy, Sr. (1870–1954) by his son Charles H. Murphy, Jr.  The Murphy Institute is supported by the endowment of the Tulane Murphy Foundation.

Past Directors
 1980–1981: William Oakland
 1981–1984: Dagobert L. Brito
 1984–2009: Richard F.Teichgraeber III
 2010–2020: Steven M. Sheffrin
 2021–present: Gary "Hoov" Hoover

References

External links 
http://www.fundinguniverse.com/company-histories/Murphy-Oil-Corporation-Company-History.html
https://web.archive.org/web/20100924002854/http://tulane.edu/news/newwave/121707_murphy.cfm
http://www.nytimes.com/2002/03/24/classified/paid-notice-deaths-murphy-charles-h.html
https://banksouthern.com/news/the-path-to-the-promise/

Tulane University
Organizations established in 1980
Organizations based in New Orleans